Pramod Narayan is a Kerala Congress (M) MLA from Kerala. He belongs to Ranni Constituency in Kerala.  He is the part of 15th Kerala Legislative Assembly. Pramod Narayan is an advocate by profession. He won the constituency election in 2021 by 1280 votes. His grandfather, C.K. Balakrishna Pillai was also a freedom fighter.

References

Kerala MLAs 2021–2026
Year of birth missing (living people)
Living people
Place of birth missing (living people)